Bachelor of Hearts is a 1958 British comedy film starring Hardy Krüger as a German who studies at Cambridge University. It was made to cash in on Krüger's popularity following the success of the war film The One That Got Away (1957). It combined elements of A Yank at Oxford with Doctor in the House.

Plot
A young German maths scholar Wolf Hauser (Hardy Krüger) arrives for a year at Cambridge on a Student exchange programme. Settling into his rooms at University College, Wolf has more than his share of trouble negotiating English customs and manners, as well as being the victim of pranks from his fellow students. He eventually finds solace with a girlfriend called Ann (Sylvia Syms).

Cast
 Hardy Krüger as Wolf Hauser 
 Sylvia Syms as Ann Wainwright 
 Ronald Lewis as Hugo Foster 
 Eric Barker as Aubrey Murdock 
 Miles Malleson as Dr. Butson 
 Newton Blick as Morgan 
 Jeremy Burnham as Adrian Baskerville 
 Peter Myers as Jeremy 
 Philip Gilbert as Conrad Lewis 
 Charles Kay as Tom Clark 
 John Richardson as Robin 
 Gillian Vaughan as Virginia 
 Sandra Francis as Lois 
 Barbara Steele as Fiona
 Catherine Feller as Helene 
 Monica Stevenson as Vanessa 
 Pamela Barreaux as Bijou 
 Beatrice Varley as Mrs. Upcott 
 Hugh Morton as Lecturer 
 Ronnie Stevens as Shop Assistant
 Everley Gregg as Lady Don
 Peter Cook as a pedestrian in the street (uncredited; Cook's film debut)

Production
Leslie Bricusse and Frederic Raphael had written revues together at Cambridge University. This led to a screenwriting career which included the scripts for Charley Moon and The Big Money. Raphael says their work on the latter, a rewrite, led to them being offered Bachelor of Hearts.

Raphael and Bricusse were approached by the producer Vivian Cox, who wanted them to write a film about Cambridge University similar to The Guinea Pig, a play and film about a working class boy who goes to a public school. Bricusse wrote "In our story, a clever young Cockney lad, in our imagining the still-baby-faced Richard Attenborough, gets a scholarship to Cambridge, where we follow his subsequent hope-fully hilarious adventures."  Raphael said the script was "based, with all but slipshod looseness, on As You Like It." 
  
The film was changed to become a vehicle for Hardy Kruger who had been in The One That Got Away. Producer Julian Wintle, who produced that film and also worked on this, said "Kruger undoubtedly has that almost indefinable something which the public recognise and welcome as star quality. Mere good looks and ability are not enough. There has to be something plus in the personality. I should say that in Kruger's case it is his manly way of acting. The teenage girls and older ones appreciate his clean-cut manner, his air of self reliance." Kruger said, "I know it is a gamble to switch to comedy after drama. But I like to ring the changes and I think it is a good thing to surprise the public."

Raphael felt director Wolf Rilla "was a rather solemn filmmaker, not wholly suited to Leslie's and my larky screenplay... Wolf had high ambitions as an auteur but lacked the force or luck to fulfil them".

According to Bricusse, the final film:
Appeared to be Pinewood's personal apology to Germany for our having won the war. It starred a Teutonically handsome leading German actor... and was directed by a somewhat solemn and serious German director... in a vaguely related but not surprisingly heavier-handed version of what we had written. Every subtle English comedic nuance was lost, and though the final film was far from being a disaster, it became what I can most charitably describe as a romantic non-comedy. Charming and talented as both Hardy and Wolf were, a comedy about U-boats rather than Cambridge might have been more appropriate - Carry On Torpedoing.
The film was originally called Light Blue then The Freshman then Bachelor of Hearts. Bricusse says this was the result of "an embarrassing ‘find a name for the movie’ competition, which provided the eventual stomach- turning title, Bachelor of Hearts."

Filming started 27 May 1958 under the title The Freshman. It was part of a boom in production from Rank Films that also included Rockets Galore, Passionate Summer, Floods of Fear, Sea of Sand, The Square Peg, Operation Amsterdam, The Captain's Table, Too Many Crooks, The Lorelei (which became Whirpool), Ferry to Hong Kong and The Thirty Nine Steps.

Sylvia Syms was loaned out from Associated British to play the female lead. She recalled "Hardy Kruger was adorable, a very nice man. It was a most enjoyable funny film to be on, and Geoff Unsworth, the cameraman, made me look stunning too."

It was the film debut of Peter Cook, who appeared as an extra for ten shillings a day. Cook's biographer says Cook was "desperately short of cash" at the time and "can be clearly seen in one scene from the film, standing in the street alongside Christopher Booker, the future co-founder of Private Eye. Booker remembers Peter keeping the bored extras amused with a stream of jokes."

Critical reception
The Guardian said "after a very heavy start it does come comically alive in its last two episodes."

Variety called it "facetious, rather embarrassing... US audiences are likely to be completely bewildered." Filmink magazine said "the film has nice colour, location footage, Belinda Steele as an ingenue, Peter Cook as an extra and maybe one funny joke."

Raphael says Kruger "went on to make some quite respectable films, but this wasn't his finest hour" and that by the time he had finished the film "I was so tired of collaboration, and of the movies, that my wife and I decided to move to Spain." He later wrote "Bachelor of Hearts was not the kind of movie that I should ever have wanted to write, but it furnished me with that vital commodity, a credit, without which no film career was likely to proceed."

References

External links
 
Bachelor of Hearts at TCMDB
Bachelor of Hearts at Letterbox
Bachelor of Hearts at BFI

1958 films
British romantic comedy films
Films directed by Wolf Rilla
1958 romantic comedy films
Films shot in Cambridgeshire
1950s English-language films
1950s British films
Films set in the University of Cambridge